Josef Hofmeister (born 17 June 1934) is a former Motorcycle rider who competed in Grasstrack, Longtrack and Speedway. He competed in six World Longtrack Championship Finals and won a hat-trick of titles between 1958 and 1960. Josef was also a World Speedway finalist on four occasion.

Hofmeister started his career in 1949 in the youth class and retired 1963 at just 29 years of age. In the 1950s and early 1960s, he was the first German star of international motorcycle racing. After retiring Josef Hofmeister ran a sports shop in Kempten / Allgäu.

Individual World Championship
 1957 -  London, Wembley Stadium - 16th - 0pts
 1958 -  London, Wembley Stadium - 15th - 2pts
 1959 -  London, Wembley Stadium - 13th - 4pts
 1960 -  London, Wembley Stadium - 8th - 6pts

World Longtrack Championship

European Championship
 1957  Stockholm (Second) 14pts
 1958  Mühldorf (Champion) 21pts
 1959  Helsinki (Champion) 19pts
 1960  Plattling (Champion) 24pts
 1961 Semi-final
 1962  Mühldorf (13th) 8pts
 1963  Malmö (12th) 7pts

Sources

 http://www.historyspeedway.nstrefa.pl/zawodnik.php?imie=Josef&nazwisko=Hofmeister
 http://www.mc-meissen-speedway.de/geschichte
 http://www.speedway.org/history/58.htm

1934 births
Living people
German speedway riders
Southampton Saints riders
Place of birth missing (living people)
Individual Speedway Long Track World Championship riders
People from Abensberg
Sportspeople from Lower Bavaria